Reussia is a genus of bryozoans belonging to the family Bryocryptellidae.

The species of this genus are found in Europe, North America.

Species:

Reussia baculina 
Reussia granulosa 
Reussia lata 
Reussia minor 
Reussia patagonica 
Reussia regularis 
Reussia strangulata

References

Bryozoan genera